The 1976 NBA All Star Game was played at the Spectrum in Philadelphia, on February 3, 1976. Philadelphia hosted three of the major four league All-Star games in honor of the Bicenntenial.

Dave Bing was the MVP.

It was also the final NBA All-Star Game played on a weekday, before switching to a Sunday game the following season, as well as the final one before the ABA-NBA merger.

Coaches: East: Tom Heinsohn, West: Al Attles.

Eastern Conference

Western Conference

Score by periods
 

Halftime— West, 50-45
Third Quarter— East, 83-80
Officials: Paul Mihalak and Darell Garretson
Attendance: 17,511.

References

National Basketball Association All-Star Game
All-Star
NBA All-Star